Coleophora albidella is a moth of the family Coleophoridae found in Europe. It was first described in 1775 by Michael Denis and Ignaz Schiffermüller,

Description
The wingspan is 13–16 mm. White with sparse, sometimes obscure, darker speckling. Forewing ground colour white. Apical cilia greyish fuscous. Antennal scape with a well-developed basal tuft. Only reliably identified by dissection and microscopic examination of the genitalia.

Adults are on wing from June to July.

The larvae feed on various species of willow including, Salix repens, Salix aurita, Salix cinerea and sometimes Salix caprea. The larvae bore into expanding leaf buds and later skeletonize young leaves. Sometimes they mine a leaf in the usual manner of other Coleophora species. It builds a pistol shaped case from silk and fragments of leaf and frass which has a mouth angle of about 70°, thus standing almost erect on the leaf. The sides of the case are usually adorned with hairs from the leaf surface.

Distribution
It is found in all of Europe, except the Balkan Peninsula.

References

External links

Swedish Moths

albidella
Moths described in 1775
Moths of Europe
Moths of Japan
Taxa named by Michael Denis
Taxa named by Ignaz Schiffermüller